James Darrell McFarland (October 4, 1947 – November 27, 2020) was an American football player, lawyer, and politician.

Football career
McFarland was  an American football player who played tight end for six seasons in the National Football League (NFL) with the Buffalo Bills, St. Louis Cardinals, and Miami Dolphins.

In 1999, he was inducted into the Nebraska Football Hall of Fame.  As of 2012, he ranks 44th on Nebraska's all-time single game receiving yards with 117 yards on 7 catches during a game against Texas A&M on September 28, 1969. He is considered to be one of Nebraska's top athletes and was considered for the Omaha World-Herald's list of top 100.

Law and political career
After leaving football, McFarland received his law degree from Cornell Law School in 1980. He practiced law in Lincoln, Nebraska. McFarland was appointed to the Nebraska Legislature as a state senator for Nebraska's 28th district to fill a vacancy and was elected to the legislature in 1986, as a Democrat and served until 1990. He later ran for governor of Nebraska. In 2017, McFarland retired from his law practice and moved to Omaha, Nebraska. He received his master's degree in fine arts in creative writing, from Creighton University.

Death
He died of pancreatic cancer on November 27, 2020, in Omaha, Nebraska, at age 73.

References

1947 births
2020 deaths
American athlete-politicians
American football tight ends
Buffalo Bills players
Cornell Law School alumni
Creighton University alumni
Deaths from cancer in Nebraska
Deaths from pancreatic cancer
Miami Dolphins players
Nebraska Cornhuskers football players
Nebraska lawyers
St. Louis Cardinals (football) players
Democratic Party Nebraska state senators
People from North Platte, Nebraska
Players of American football from Nebraska